Tom Mercer (born November 10, 1964) is a former professional tennis player from the United States.  

Mercer enjoyed most of his tennis success while playing doubles. During his career, he made the finals in two doubles events. He achieved a career-high doubles ranking of World No. 112 in 1993.

Career finals

Doubles (2 runner-ups)

External links
 
 

American male tennis players
Tennis players from Pittsburgh
1964 births
Living people